The 2011 New York Yankees season was the 109th season for the New York Yankees franchise.  The Yankees began the season at home against the Detroit Tigers on Thursday, March 31. The Yankees clinched a playoff berth in the first game of a doubleheader on September 21, and clinched the AL East division title in the second game. The Yankees season ended on October 6 when they lost a deciding Game 5 of the 2011 American League Division Series to the Detroit Tigers 3–2.  It was the first time since 2007 that the Yankees lost an elimination game at home.

The 2011 season was the final season in the playing career of longtime Yankees catcher Jorge Posada.

Offseason

Manager Joe Girardi's three-year contract with the Yankees ended at the conclusion of the 2010 season. Having won one World Series and bringing his team to the playoffs the past two seasons, the Yankees quickly signed him to a new 3-year deal worth $9 million. After firing pitching coach Dave Eiland, they replaced him with Cubs pitching coach Larry Rothschild.

In November, they added minor leaguers Melky Mesa, Dellin Betances, Ryan Pope, and Brandon Laird to the 40-man roster.  Mesa had to be added to avoid eligibility to be a minor league free agent, while Betances, Pope, and Laird had to be added to prevent being eligible for the Rule 5 draft.

In November, long-time Yankees Derek Jeter, Andy Pettitte, and Mariano Rivera all became free agents, as well as veterans Nick Johnson, Javier Vázquez, Marcus Thames, Kerry Wood, Lance Berkman, Austin Kearns, and Chad Moeller. Dustin Moseley and Alfredo Aceves also became free agents as the Yankees opted not to tender their contracts. On November 18, 2010, the Yankees traded Juan Miranda to the Diamondbacks in exchange for minor league pitcher Scottie Allen. On November 19, 2010, they released reliever Jonathan Albaladejo per an agreement made with Albaladejo and the Yomiuri Giants of Nippon Professional Baseball.

Sergio Mitre avoided arbitration with the Yankees by signing a one-year, $900,000 deal. Derek Jeter and the Yankees agreed to a new contract of $51 million over 3 years with fourth-year option after 2013. Mariano Rivera signed a two-year, $30 million contract with the Yankees, which he hinted may be the last contract of his career.

In the Rule 5 draft, the Yankees selected pitchers Robert Fish from the Angels and Daniel Turpen from the Red Sox.  The Astros meanwhile selected Yankees minor leaguer Lance Pendleton while the Padres selected George Kontos.

On December 13, 2010, it was announced that top free agent Cliff Lee rejected the Yankees six-year, $138 million contract offer to sign a five-year, $120 million contract with the Philadelphia Phillies. Lee was the Yankees top priority in the offseason.  In his place, the Yankees signed catcher Russell Martin and reliever Pedro Feliciano.

The Yankees have signed various former Major Leaguers to minor league deals, such as Brian Anderson, Luis Ayala, Ronnie Belliard, Doug Bernier, Buddy Carlyle, Eric Chavez, Bartolo Colón, Neal Cotts, Freddy García, Gustavo Molina, Mark Prior, Andy Sisco, and Luis Vizcaíno. Vizcaino's contract was later voided due to injury. They also claimed outfielder Jordan Parraz off of waivers from the Boston Red Sox.

In January 2011, the Yankees signed Rafael Soriano to a three-year contract worth $35 million and agreed with Andruw Jones on a one-year, $2 million contract, pending a physical. This deal was made official on February 14.

On February 2, the Yankees acquired Justin Maxwell from the Washington Nationals in a trade for minor league pitcher Adam Olbrychowski. To make room for him on the roster, Parraz was designated for assignment.

On February 4, Andy Pettitte announced his retirement from baseball via press conference. Pettitte played 13 seasons with the Yankees and 3 with the Astros, he was a 3x All Star selection, a 5x World Series champion, and finally a 2001 ALCS MVP.

Roster

Season standings

Record vs. opponents

March/April
Facing the Detroit Tigers on Opening Day, Mariano Rivera notched his 560th career save to pull within 42 saves of surpassing Trevor Hoffman for the all-time Major League record.  This also marked Rivera's third career Opening Day save.

On April 3 Mark Teixeira hit his third straight home run of the season, in three consecutive days marking the first time a Yankees player had accomplished this since Dave Winfield did it in 1983. Never before—not even in their Murderers' Row days—had the Yanks hit nine homers through their first three games. Eight had been enough twice, in 1932 and '81.

Against the Minnesota Twins the Yankees hit two more home runs, coming off the bats of Alex Rodriguez and Jorge Posada, bringing the Yankees home run total in the first four games to 11, falling short of the franchise record set at 12 in 2003. With the win clinched Iván Nova became the first rookie Yankee pitcher to record a win in the first four games of the season since Al Leiter did it in 1988.

On April 5 in the second game against the Twins, Teixeira and Andruw Jones both connected for home runs, bringing the total number hit by the Yankees in the first five games to 13, tying the franchise record set by the 1932 World Champion Yankees.

Going into the game against the Toronto Blue Jays on April 19, the Yankees hit 27 home runs in the first 14 games, the most in the history of the franchise.

May
Against the Texas Rangers on May 8, Francisco Cervelli connected for the first grand slam of his career in a 12–5 Yankee win.

On May 25, Mariano Rivera made his 1,000th appearance with the Yankees, making him the 15th reliever in Major League history to accomplish the feat, and the first to do so for one team.

Facing the Seattle Mariners on May 29, Derek Jeter stole his 327th base, breaking Rickey Henderson's record for the most in Yankees history.

June
On June 24, facing the Colorado Rockies, A. J. Burnett struck out 4 batters in the 6th inning, becoming the first Yankee to accomplish this feat.

Against the Milwaukee Brewers on June 30, Mark Teixeira hit the 300th home run of his career.

July
On July 9 against the Tampa Bay Rays, Derek Jeter became the first Yankee player in history and the 28th player in MLB history to join the 3,000 hit club with a home-run off David Price in the 3rd inning. He is the only player in the 3,000 hit club to record all of his hits with the New York Yankees and only the second player to record his milestone hit with a home-run, the other player being Wade Boggs. Derek is also the second player to record five hits during his 3,000th hit game, the other player being Craig Biggio, going 5–5 in the game.

On July 30, against the Baltimore Orioles, the Yankees scored a club record 12 runs in the first inning, en route to a 17–3 victory.

August
On August 4, the Yankees completed their first four-game sweep on the road against the Chicago White Sox since 1976 in a 7–2 victory. It was only the third instance in modern baseball history in which a team swept a four-game series without giving up a walk.

Facing the Boston Red Sox, on August 5, Jeter's run scored in the sixth inning was the 1,742nd of his career, moving him past Honus Wagner for sole possession of 21st place on baseball's all-time list.

On August 25, the Yankees became the first team in history to hit three grand slam home runs in one game with a 22–9 win over the Oakland Athletics.  It was done by Robinson Canó, Russell Martin, and Curtis Granderson.

September
On September 13 against the Seattle Mariners, Mariano Rivera became the second player in history to attain 600 saves.  He also became the first to get all 600 with a single team.

On September 19 against the Minnesota Twins, Mariano Rivera broke Trevor Hoffman's all-time save record with his 602nd career save.

The Yankees clinched a playoff berth on September 21 against the Tampa Bay Rays and, later that day during the 2nd game of the doubleheader, clinched their 17th American League East crown.

October and postseason

The Yankees faced off with the Detroit Tigers in the ALDS. Game 1 was delayed by rain but continued a day later. Behind Robinson Canó's grand slam, the Yankees won the opener, 9–3. The Tigers won Game 2, 5–3, on the strength of a performance by Max Scherzer.  When the series moved to Detroit, the Tigers took the series lead by edging the Yankees 5–4, getting a seventh-inning go-ahead Delmon Young home run. Starter A. J. Burnett, who got the starting nod because the Game 1 rainout forced the team to reshuffle its rotation, guided the Yankees to a 10–1 Game 4 win, forcing a decisive Game 5.  Back home for the win-or-go-home Game 5, New York dropped a 3–2 decision to the Tigers, who jumped in front with back-to-back, first-inning solo home runs from Delmon Young and Don Kelly. In the finale, the Yankees were done in by their inability to come through with runners in scoring position, as they stranded 11 runners.

Longtime Yankees catcher Jorge Posada retired following the 2011 postseason.

Game log

|- align="center" bgcolor="ccffcc"
| 1 || March 31 || Tigers ||6–3||Chamberlain (1–0)||Coke (0–1)||Rivera (1)||48,226||1–0
|- align="center" bgcolor="ccffcc"
| 2 || April 2 || Tigers ||10–6||Burnett (1–0)||Penny (0–1)||Rivera (2)||41,462||2–0
|- align="center" bgcolor="ffbbbb"
| 3 || April 3 || Tigers ||7–10||Scherzer (1–0)||Hughes (0–1)||Valverde (1)||40,574||2–1
|- align="center" bgcolor="ccffcc"
| 4 || April 4 || Twins ||4–3||Nova (1–0)||Baker (0–1)||Rivera (3)||40,311||3–1
|- align="center" bgcolor="ffbbbb"
| 5 || April 5 || Twins ||4–5 (10)||Capps (1–0) ||Logan (0–1) ||Nathan (2) ||40,267||3–2
|- align="center" bgcolor="bbbbbb"
||| April 6 || Twins || colspan=6| Postponed (rain); Makeup: September 19
|- align="center" bgcolor="ccffcc"
| 6 || April 7 || Twins ||4–3||Burnett (2–0)||Liriano (0–2)||Rivera (4)||41,512||4–2
|- align="center" bgcolor="ffbbbb"
| 7 || April 8 || @ Red Sox ||6–9||Lackey (1–1) ||Colón (0–1) ||Papelbon (1) ||37,178||4–3
|- align="center" bgcolor="ccffcc"
| 8 || April 9 || @ Red Sox ||9–4||Robertson (1–0)||Buchholz (0–2)||||37,488||5–3
|- align="center" bgcolor="ffbbbb"
| 9 || April 10 || @ Red Sox ||0–4||Beckett (1–1)||Sabathia (0–1)||||37,861||5–4
|- align="center" bgcolor="bbbbbb"
| || April 12 || Orioles || colspan=6| Postponed (rain); Makeup: July 30 as part of a Doubleheader
|- align="center" bgcolor="ccffcc"
| 10 || April 13 || Orioles ||7–4||Burnett (3–0)||Tillman (0–1)||Rivera (5)||42,171||6–4
|- align="center" bgcolor="ccffcc"
| 11 || April 14 || Orioles || 6–5 (10) || Rivera (1–0)|| Gonzalez (0–1)||  || 40,517 || 7–4
|- align="center" bgcolor="ffbbbb"
| 12 || April 15 || Rangers ||3–5||Harrison (3–0)||Nova (1–1)||Feliz (5)||40,814||7–5
|- align="center" bgcolor="bbffbb"
| 13 || April 16 || Rangers ||5–2||García (1–0)||Holland (2–1)||Rivera (6)||41,876||8–5
|- align="center" bgcolor="bbffbb"
| 14 || April 17 || Rangers ||6–5||Soriano (1–0)||Rhodes (0–1) ||Rivera (7)||40,811||9–5
|- align="center" bgcolor="ffbbbb"
| 15 || April 19 || @ Blue Jays ||5–6 (10)|| Rauch (1–1)||Nova (1–2)|| || 25,250||9–6
|- align="center" bgcolor="bbffbb"
| 16 || April 20 || @ Blue Jays ||6–2||Colón (1–1)||Cecil (1–2)||Soriano (1)||26,062||10–6
|- align="center" bgcolor="bbbbbb"
||| April 22 || @ Orioles || colspan=6| Postponed (rain); Makeup: August 27 as part of a Doubleheader
|- align="center" bgcolor="bbffbb"
| 17 || April 23 || @ Orioles ||15–3||Sabathia (1–1)|| Bergesen (0–3)||||30,054||11–6
|- align="center" bgcolor="bbffbb"
| 18 || April 24 || @ Orioles ||6–3 (11)||Logan (1–1)||Berken (0–1)|| ||25,051||12–6
|- align="center" bgcolor="ffbbbb"
| 19 || April 25 || White Sox ||0–2||Humber (2–2)||Burnett (3–1)||Santos (1)||40,506||12–7
|- align="center" bgcolor="ffbbbb"
| 20 || April 26 || White Sox ||2–3||Floyd (3–1)||Soriano (1–1)||Santos (2)||40,785||12–8
|- align="center" bgcolor="bbffbb"
| 21 || April 27 || White Sox ||3–1||Colón (2–1)||Buehrle (1–3)||Rivera (8)||40,856||13–8
|- align="center" bgcolor="bbffbb"
| 22 || April 28 || White Sox ||12–3||Sabathia (2–1)||Jackson (2–3)|| ||40,081||14–8
|- align="center" bgcolor="ffbbbb"
| 23 || April 29 || Blue Jays ||3–5||Romero (2–3)||García (1–1)||Rauch (5)||40,830||14–9 
|- align="center" bgcolor="bbffbb"
| 24 || April 30 || Blue Jays ||5–4||Burnett (4–1)||Drabek (2–1) ||Rivera (9)||42,460||15–9   
|-

|- align="center" bgcolor="bbffbb"
| 25 || May 1 || Blue Jays ||5–2||Nova (2–2)||Litsch (2–2)||Rivera (10)||43,363||16–9
|- align="center" bgcolor="bbffbb"
| 26 || May 2 || @ Tigers ||5–3||Chamberlain (2–0)||Valverde (2–1)||Rivera (11)||22,852||17–9  
|- align="center" bgcolor="ffbbbb"
| 27 || May 3 || @ Tigers ||2–4||Penny (2–3)||Sabathia (2–2)||Valverde (6)||23,551||17–10
|- align="center" bgcolor="ffbbbb"
| 28 || May 4 || @ Tigers ||0–4||Scherzer (5–0)||García (1–2)|| ||22,569||17–11
|- align="center" bgcolor="ffbbbb"
| 29 || May 5 || @ Tigers ||3–6||Porcello (2–2)||Burnett (4–2)|| ||30,572||17–12
|- align="center" bgcolor="bbffbb"
| 30 || May 6 || @ Rangers ||4–1||Nova (3–2)||Harrison (3–4)||Rivera (12)||49,069||18–12
|- align="center" bgcolor="ffbbbb"
| 31 || May 7 || @ Rangers ||5–7||Rhodes (1–1)||Logan (1–2)||Feliz (6)||49,574||18–13
|- align="center" bgcolor="bbffbb"
| 32 || May 8 || @ Rangers ||12–5||Sabathia (3–2)||Rhodes (1–2)|| ||48,057||19–13
|- align="center" bgcolor="bbffbb"
| 33 || May 10 || Royals ||3–1||García (2–2)||Davies (1–5)||Rivera (13)||41,275||20–13
|- align="center" bgcolor="ffbbbb"
| 34 || May 11 || Royals ||3–4 (11)||Soria (3–0)||Carlyle (0–1)||Coleman (1)||40,164||20–14
|- align="center" bgcolor="ffbbbb"
| 35 || May 12 || Royals ||5–11||O'Sullivan (2–2)||Nova (3–3)|| ||41,790||20–15
|- align="center" bgcolor="ffbbbb"
| 36 || May 13 || Red Sox ||4–5||Buchholz (4–3)||Colón (2–2)||Papelbon (6)||48,254||20–16
|- align="center" bgcolor="ffbbbb"
| 37 || May 14 || Red Sox ||0–6||Beckett (3–1)||Sabathia (3–3)|| ||48,790||20–17
|- align="center" bgcolor="ffbbbb"
| 38 || May 15 || Red Sox ||5–7||Lester (5–1)||García (2–3)||Papelbon (7)||46,945||20–18
|- align="center" bgcolor="ffbbbb"
| 39 || May 16 || @ Rays ||5–6||Cruz (2–0)||Burnett (4–3)||Farnsworth (8)||25,024||20–19
|- align="center" bgcolor="bbffbb"
| 40 || May 17 || @ Rays ||6–2||Nova (4–3)||Shields (4–2)|| ||27,123||21–19
|- align="center" bgcolor="bbffbb"
| 41 || May 18 || @ Orioles ||4–1 (15)||Noesí (1–0)||Accardo (2–1)||||20,589||22–19
|- align="center" bgcolor="bbffbb"
| 42 || May 19 || @ Orioles ||13–2||Sabathia (4–3)||Bergesen (1–5)|| ||24,939||23–19
|- align="center" bgcolor="ffbbbb"
| 43 || May 20 || Mets ||1–2||Dickey (2–5)||García (2–4)||Rodríguez (15)||47,874||23–20
|- align="center" bgcolor="bbffbb"
| 44 || May 21 || Mets ||7–3||Burnett (5–3)||Capuano (3–5)|| ||48,286||24–20
|- align="center" bgcolor="bbffbb"
| 45 || May 22 || Mets ||9–3||Ayala (1–0)||Pelfrey (3–4)||||48,293||25–20
|- align="center" bgcolor="ffbbbb"
| 46 || May 23 || Blue Jays ||3–7||Villanueva (2–0)||Colón (2–3)||||41,946||25–21
|- align="center" bgcolor="bbffbb"
| 47 || May 24 || Blue Jays ||5–4||Sabathia (5–3)||Francisco (1–2)||||41,519||26–21
|- align="center" bgcolor="bbffbb"
| 48 || May 25 || Blue Jays ||7–3||García (3–4)||Reyes (0–4)||||43,201||27–21
|- align="center" bgcolor="ffbbbb"
| 49 || May 27 || @ Mariners ||3–4||Pauley (3–0)||Ayala (1–1)||League (13)||33,715||27–22
|- align="center" bgcolor="ffbbbb"
| 50 || May 28 || @ Mariners ||4–5 (12)||Pauley (4–0)||Rivera (1–1)|| ||37,354||27–23
|- align="center" bgcolor="bbffbb"
| 51 || May 29 || @ Mariners ||7–1||Sabathia (6–3)||Vargas (3–3)|| ||37,290||28–23
|- align="center" bgcolor="bbffbb"
| 52 || May 30 || @ Athletics ||5–0||Colón (3–3)||Cahill (6–3)|| ||35,067||29–23
|- align="center" bgcolor="bbffbb"
| 53 || May 31 || @ Athletics ||10–3||García (3–4)||Anderson (3–5)|| ||22,581||30–23
|-

|- align="center" bgcolor="bbffbb"
| 54 || June 1 || @ Athletics ||4–2||Burnett (6–3)||Gonzalez (5–3)||Rivera (14)||25,469||31–23
|- align="center" bgcolor="ffbbbb"
| 55 || June 3 || @ Angels ||2–3||Weaver (7–4)||Nova (4–4)||Walden (13)|| 42,521||31–24
|- align="center" bgcolor="bbffbb"
| 56 || June 4 || @ Angels ||3–2||Sabathia (7–3)||Santana (3–5)||Rivera (15)||43,619||32–24
|- align="center" bgcolor="bbffbb"
| 57 || June 5 || @ Angels ||5–3||Colón (4–3)||Piñeiro (2–3)||Rivera (16)||43,524||33–24
|- align="center" bgcolor="ffbbbb"
| 58 || June 7 || Red Sox ||4–6||Lester (8–2)||García (4–5)||Papelbon (12)||48,450||33–25
|- align="center" bgcolor="ffbbbb"
| 59 || June 8 || Red Sox ||6–11||Wakefield (3–1)||Burnett (6–4)||Aceves (1)||47,863||33–26
|- align="center" bgcolor="ffbbbb"
| 60 || June 9 || Red Sox ||3–8||Beckett (5–2)||Sabathia (7–4)|| ||48,845||33–27
|- align="center" bgcolor="bbffbb"
| 61 || June 10 || Indians ||11–7||Nova (5–4)||Carmona (3–8)|| ||45,679||34–27
|- align="center" bgcolor="bbffbb"
| 62 || June 11 || Indians ||4–0||Colón (5–3)||Talbot (2–3)||||47,048||35–27
|- align="center" bgcolor="bbffbb"
| 63 || June 12 || Indians ||9–1||García (5–5)||Tomlin (7–4)|| ||46,791||36–27
|- align="center" bgcolor="ffbbbb"
| 64 || June 13 || Indians ||0–1||Carrasco (6–3)||Burnett (6–5)||Perez (16)||43,551||36–28
|- align="center" bgcolor="bbffbb"
| 65 || June 14 || Rangers ||12–4||Sabathia (8–4)||Ogando (7–1)|| ||43,457||37–28
|- align="center" bgcolor="bbffbb"
| 66 || June 15 || Rangers ||12–4||Nova (6–4)||Holland (5–2)|| ||45,969||38–28
|- align="center" bgcolor="bbffbb"
| 67 || June 16 || Rangers ||3–2 (12)||Wade (1–0)||Kirkman (1–1)|| ||47,487||39–28
|- align="center" bgcolor="ffbbbb"
| 68 || June 17 || @ Cubs ||1–3||Davis (1–5)||García (5–6)||Mármol (14)||42,219||39–29
|- align="center" bgcolor="bbffbb"
| 69 || June 18 || @ Cubs ||4–3||Burnett (7–5)||Dempster (5–6)||Rivera (17)||42,236||40–29
|- align="center" bgcolor="bbffbb"
| 70 || June 19 || @ Cubs ||10–4||Sabathia (9–4)||Marshall (3–2)|| ||41,828||41–29
|- align="center" bgcolor="bbffbb"
| 71 || June 20 || @ Reds ||5–3||Nova (7–4)||Wood (5–5)||Rivera (18)||41,173||42–29
|- align="center" bgcolor="bbbbbb"
||| June 21 || @ Reds || colspan=6| Postponed (rain); Makeup: June 22 as part of a Doubleheader
|- align="center" bgcolor="bbffbb"
| 72 || June 22 || @ Reds ||4–2||García (6–6)||Leake (6–4)||Rivera (19)||40,010||43–29
|- align="center" bgcolor="ffbbbb"
| 73 || June 22 || @ Reds ||2–10||Cueto (5–2)||Gordon (0–1)|| ||41,367||43–30
|- align="center" bgcolor="ffbbbb"
| 74 || June 24 || Rockies ||2–4||Jiménez (3–7)||Burnett (7–6)||Street (23)||46,028||43–31
|- align="center" bgcolor="bbffbb"
| 75 || June 25 || Rockies ||8–3||Sabathia (10–4)||Cook (0–3)|| ||46,900||44–31
|- align="center" bgcolor="bbffbb"
| 76 || June 26 || Rockies ||6–4||Logan (2–2)||Belisle (5–3)||Rivera (20)||47,894||45–31
|- align="center" bgcolor="bbffbb"
| 77 || June 28 || Brewers ||12–2||García (7–6) ||Greinke (7–3) || ||45,575 ||46–31
|- align="center" bgcolor="bbffbb"
| 78 || June 29 || Brewers ||5–2||Burnett (8–6)||Marcum (7–3)||Rivera (21)||46,450||47–31
|- align="center" bgcolor="bbffbb"
| 79 || June 30 || Brewers ||5–0||Sabathia (11–4)||Wolf (6–5)|| ||46,903||48–31
|-

|- align="center" bgcolor="bbffbb"
| 80 || July 1 || @ Mets ||5–1||Nova (8–4)||Niese (7–7)|| ||42,020||49–31
|- align="center" bgcolor="bbffbb"
| 81 || July 2 || @ Mets ||5–2||Colón (6–3)||Gee (8–2)|| ||42,042||50–31
|- align="center" bgcolor="ffbbbb"
| 82 || July 3 || @ Mets ||2–3 (10)||Rodríguez (2–2)||Ayala (1–2)|| ||41,513||50–32
|- align="center" bgcolor="ffbbbb"
| 83 || July 4 || @ Indians ||3–6||Tomlin (10–4)||Burnett (8–7)||Perez (20)||40,676||50–33
|- align="center" bgcolor="bbffbb"
| 84 || July 5 || @ Indians ||9–2||Sabathia (12–4)||Carrasco (8–5)|| ||30,100||51–33
|- align="center" bgcolor="ffbbbb"
| 85 || July 6 || @ Indians ||3–5||Masterson (7–6)||Hughes (0–2)||Perez (21)||31,926||51–34
|- align="center" bgcolor="ffbbbb"
| 86 || July 7 || Rays ||1–5||Niemann (4–4)||Colón (6–4) || ||47,787||51–35
|- align="center" bgcolor="bbbbbb"
| || July 8 || Rays ||colspan=6| Postponed (rain); Makeup: September 22
|- align="center" bgcolor="bbffbb"
| 87 || July 9 || Rays ||5–4||Robertson (2–0)||Peralta (2–4)||Rivera (22)||48,103||52–35
|- align="center" bgcolor="bbffbb"
| 88 || July 10 || Rays ||1–0 ||Sabathia (13–4) ||Shields (8–7) || ||47,350||53–35
|- align="center" bgcolor="
|colspan="9" style="background:#bbcaff;"|All-Star Break NL defeats AL 5–1.
|- align="center" bgcolor="ffbbbb"
| 89 || July 14 || @ Blue Jays ||7–16||Reyes (5–7)||Colón (6–5)|| ||37,342||53–36
|- align="center" bgcolor="ffbbbb"
| 90 || July 15 || @ Blue Jays ||1–7||Morrow (6–4)||García (7–7)|| ||33,525||53–37
|- align="center" bgcolor="bbffbb"
| 91 || July 16 || @ Blue Jays ||4–1||Sabathia (14–4)||Romero (7–9)||Rivera (23)||45,606||54–37
|- align="center" bgcolor="bbffbb"
| 92 || July 17 || @ Blue Jays ||7–2||Hughes (1–2)||Villanueva (5–2)|| ||36,586||55–37
|- align="center" bgcolor="bbffbb"
| 93 || July 18 || @ Rays ||5–4||Robertson (3–0)||Torres (0–1)||Rivera (24)||22,471||56–37
|- align="center" bgcolor="ffbbbb"
| 94 || July 19 || @ Rays ||2–3||Hellickson (9–7)||Colón (6–6)||Peralta (1)||22,780||56–38
|- align="center" bgcolor="bbffbb"
| 95 || July 20 || @ Rays ||4–0||García (8–7)||Price (9–8)|| ||21,505||57–38
|- align="center" bgcolor="ffbbbb"
| 96 || July 21 || @ Rays ||1–2||Shields (9–8)||Sabathia (14–5)||Farnsworth (19)||29,279||57–39
|- align="center" bgcolor="bbffbb"
| 97 || July 22 || Athletics ||17–7||Noesí (2–0)||Cahill (8–9)|| ||46,921 ||58–39
|- align="center" bgcolor="ffbbbb"
| 98 || July 23 || Athletics ||3–4||Harden (2–1)||Burnett (8–8)||Bailey (11)||46,188||58–40
|- align="center" bgcolor="bbffbb"
| 99 || July 24 || Athletics ||7–5||Colón (7–6)||Gonzalez (9–7)||Rivera (25)||45,586||59–40
|- align="center" bgcolor="bbffbb"
| 100 || July 25 || Mariners ||10–3||García (9–7)||Vargas (6–9)|| ||44,365||60–40
|- align="center" bgcolor="bbffbb"
| 101 || July 26 || Mariners ||4–1||Sabathia (15–5)||Fister (3–12)||Rivera (26)||46,132||61–40
|- align="center" bgcolor="ffbbbb"
| 102 || July 27 || Mariners ||2–9||Hernández (9–9)||Hughes (1–3)|| ||47,090||61–41
|- align="center" bgcolor="ffbbbb"
| 103 || July 29 || Orioles ||2–4||Guthrie (5–14)||Burnett (8–9)||Gregg (17)||46,499||61–42
|- align="center" bgcolor="bbffbb"
| 104 || July 30 || Orioles ||8–3||Colón (8–6)||Tillman (2–4)|| ||46,469||62–42
|- align="center" bgcolor="bbffbb"
| 105 || July 30 || Orioles ||17–3||Nova (9–4)||Britton (6–8)|| ||43,190||63–42
|- align="center" bgcolor="bbffbb"
| 106 || July 31 || Orioles ||4–2||García (10–7)||Arrieta (10–8)||Rivera (27)||46,913||64–42
|-

|- align="center" bgcolor="bbffbb"
| 107 || August 1 || @ White Sox ||3–2||Sabathia (16–5)||Peavy (4–5)||Rivera (28)||24,142||65–42
|- align="center" bgcolor="bbffbb"
| 108 || August 2 || @ White Sox ||6–0 (7)||Hughes (2–3)||Danks (4–9)|| ||21,661||66–42
|- align="center" bgcolor="bbffbb"
| 109 || August 3 || @ White Sox ||18–7||Wade (2–0)||Floyd (9–10)|| ||23,873||67–42
|- align="center" bgcolor="bbffbb"
| 110 || August 4 || @ White Sox ||7–2||Nova (10–4)||Humber (8–8)|| ||28,088||68–42
|- align="center" bgcolor="bbffbb"
| 111 || August 5 || @ Red Sox ||3–2||Logan (3–2) ||Lester (11–5) ||Rivera (29) ||38,006 ||69–42
|- align="center" bgcolor="ffbbbb"
| 112 || August 6 || @ Red Sox ||4–10||Lackey (10–8)||Sabathia (16–6)|| ||37,416 ||69–43
|- align="center" bgcolor="ffbbbb"
| 113 || August 7 || @ Red Sox ||2–3 (10)||Bard (2–5)||Hughes (2–4)|| ||38,189||69–44
|- align="center" bgcolor="ffbbbb"
| 114 || August 9 || Angels ||4–6||Downs (6–2)||Rivera (1–2)||Walden (26)||46,466||69–45
|- align="center" bgcolor="bbffbb"
| 115 || August 10 || Angels ||9–3||Nova (11–4)||Richards (0–1)|| ||46,967||70–45
|- align="center" bgcolor="bbffbb"
| 116 || August 11 || Angels || 6–5 || Soriano (2–1)|| Rodney (2–4)|| Rivera (30)|| 47,431 ||71–45
|- align="center" bgcolor="ffbbbb"
| 117 || August 12 || Rays ||1–5||Price (10–10)||Sabathia (16–7)|| ||47,894||71–46
|- align="center" bgcolor="bbffbb"
| 118 || August 13 || Rays ||9–2||Hughes (3–4)||Hellickson (10–8)|| ||47,804||72–46
|- align="center" bgcolor="bbbbbb"
| || August 14 || Rays ||colspan=6| Postponed (rain); Makeup: September 21
|- align="center" bgcolor="bbffbb"
| 119 || August 15 || @ Royals ||7–4||Burnett (9–9)||Paulino (1–9)||Rivera (31)||24,879||73–46
|- align="center" bgcolor="bbffbb"
| 120 || August 16 || @ Royals ||9–7||Nova (12–4)||Duffy (3–7)||Rivera (32)||22,258||74–46
|- align="center" bgcolor="ffbbbb"
| 121 || August 17 || @ Royals ||4–5||Chen (8–5)||Colón (8–7)||Soria (22)||22,435||74–47
|- align="center" bgcolor="bbffbb"
| 122 || August 18 || @ Twins ||8–4||Sabathia (17–7)||Duensing (8–12)|| ||41,126||75–47
|- align="center" bgcolor="bbffbb"
| 123 || August 19 || @ Twins ||8–1|| Hughes (4–4)|| Slowey (0–1)|| ||41,328||76–47
|- align="center" bgcolor="ffbbbb"
| 124 || August 20 || @ Twins ||4–9||Liriano (9–9)||Burnett (9–10)|| || ||76–48
|- align="center" bgcolor="bbffbb"
| 125 || August 21 || @ Twins ||3–0||Nova (13–4)||Dumatrait (1–2)||Rivera (33)||41,242||77–48
|- align="center" bgcolor="ffbbbb"
| 126 || August 23 || Athletics ||5–6||McCarthy (7–6)||Colón (8–8)||Bailey (17)||47,343||77–49
|- align="center" bgcolor="ffbbbb"
| 127 || August 24 || Athletics ||4–6 (10)||De Los Santos (2–0)||Soriano (2–2)||Bailey (18)||47,271||77–50
|- align="center" bgcolor="bbffbb"
| 128 || August 25 || Athletics || 22–9 || Logan (4–2) || De Los Santos (2–1) || || 46,369 ||78–50
|- align="center" bgcolor="ffbbbb"
| 129 || August 26 || @ Orioles ||5–12||Hunter (3–2)||Burnett (9–11)|| || 32,762 ||78–51
|- align="center" bgcolor="bbbbbb"
| || August 27 || @ Orioles ||colspan=6| Postponed (Hurricane Irene); Makeup: September 8
|- align="center" bgcolor="ffbbbb"
| 130 || August 28 || @ Orioles ||0–2||Britton (8–9)||Colón (8–9)||Gregg (19)||28,751||78–52
|- align="center" bgcolor="bbffbb"
| 131 || August 28 || @ Orioles ||8–3||Nova (14–4)||Matusz (1–7)|| ||37,528||79–52
|- align="center" bgcolor="bbffbb"
| 132 || August 29 || @ Orioles ||3–2||García (11–7)||Simón (4–7)||Rivera (34)||18,223||80–52
|- align="center" bgcolor="bbffbb"
| 133 || August 30 || @ Red Sox ||5–2||Sabathia (18–7)||Lackey (12–10)||Rivera (35)||37,773||81–52
|- align="center" bgcolor="ffbbbb"
| 134 || August 31 || @ Red Sox ||5–9||Beckett (12–5)||Hughes (4–5)|| ||38,021||81–53
|-

|- align="center" bgcolor="bbffbb"
| 135 || September 1 || @ Red Sox ||4–2||Wade (3–0)||Aceves (9–2)||Rivera (36)||38,074||82–53
|- align="center" bgcolor="bbffbb"
| 136 || September 2 || Blue Jays ||3–2||Nova (15–4)||Morrow (9–10)||Rivera (37)||47,240||83–53
|- align="center" bgcolor="bbffbb"
| 137 || September 3 || Blue Jays ||6–4||Logan (5–2)||Romero (13–10)||Robertson (1)||47,744||84–53
|- align="center" bgcolor="bbffbb"
| 138 || September 4 || Blue Jays ||9–3||Sabathia (19–7)||Cecil (4–8)|| ||47,464||85–53
|- align="center" bgcolor="bbffbb"
| 139 || September 5 || Orioles ||11–10||Laffey (2–1)||Johnson (5–5)||Rivera (38)||45,069||86–53
|- align="center" bgcolor="bbffbb"
| 140 || September 6 || Orioles ||5–3||Wade (4–0)||Hunter (3–3)||Rivera (39)||44,573||87–53
|- align="center" bgcolor="ffbbbb"
| 141 || September 7 || Orioles ||4–5  (11) ||Strop (1–1)|| Noesí (2–1)||Johnson (3)||40,104|| 87–54
|- align="center" bgcolor="ffbbbb"
| 142 || September 8 || @ Orioles ||4–5  (10) ||Rapada (1–0)||Proctor (2–4)|| ||33,841||87–55
|- align="center" bgcolor="ffbbbb"
| 143 || September 9 || @ Angels ||1–2||Walden (5–3)||Laffey (2–2)|| ||41,014||87–56
|- align="center" bgcolor="ffbbbb"
| 144 || September 10 || @ Angels ||0–6||Haren (15–8)||Sabathia (19–8)|| ||43,774||87–57
|- align="center" bgcolor="bbffbb"
| 145 || September 11 || @ Angels ||6–5||Wade (5–0)||Santana (11–11)||Rivera (40)||42,581||88–57
|- align="center" bgcolor="bbffbb"
| 146 || September 12 || @ Mariners ||9–3||Hughes (5–5)||Hernández (14–12)|| ||22,029||89–57
|- align="center" bgcolor="bbffbb"
| 147 || September 13 || @ Mariners ||3–2||Burnett (10–11)||Furbush (3–8)||Rivera (41)||18,306||90–57
|- align="center" bgcolor="ffbbbb"
| 148 || September 14 || @ Mariners ||1–2  (12) ||Delabar (1–0)||Wade (5–1)|| ||20,327||90–58
|- align="center" bgcolor="ffbbbb"
| 149 || September 16 || @ Blue Jays ||4–5||Janssen (5–0)|| Logan (5–3)|| ||29,323||90–59
|- align="center" bgcolor="bbffbb"
| 150 || September 17 || @ Blue Jays ||7–6||Laffey (3–2)||Villanueva (6–4)||Rivera (42)||39,288||91–59
|- align="center" bgcolor="ffbbbb"
| 151 || September 18 || @ Blue Jays ||0–3||Morrow (10–11)||García (11–8)||Francisco (16)||34,657||91–60
|- align="center" bgcolor="bbffbb"
| 152 || September 19 || Twins ||6–4||Wade (6–1)||Diamond (1–5)||Rivera (43)||40,045||92–60
|- align="center" bgcolor="bbffbb"
| 153 || September 20 || Rays ||5–0||Nova (16–4)||Davis (10–10)|| ||46,944||93–60
|- align="center" bgcolor="bbffbb"
| 154 || September 21 || Rays ||4–2||Ayala (2–2) ||Shields (15–12) ||Rivera (44) ||42,755||94–60
|- align="center" bgcolor="bbffbb"
| 155 || September 21 || Rays ||4–2||Robertson (4–0)||McGee (3–2)||Soriano (2) ||45,586||95–60
|- align="center" bgcolor="ffbbbb"
| 156 || September 22 || Rays ||8–15|| Moore (1–0) ||Colón (8–10)|| ||47,470||95–61
|- align="center" bgcolor="bbbbbb"
| || September 23 || Red Sox ||colspan=6| Postponed (rain); Makeup: September 25 as part of a doubleheader
|- align="center" bgcolor="bbffbb"
| 157 || September 24 || Red Sox ||9–1||García (12–8) ||Lester (15–9)|| ||49,556||96–61
|- align="center" bgcolor="bbffbb"
| 158 || September 25 || Red Sox ||6–2||Burnett (11–11)||Wakefield (7–8)|| ||49,541||97–61
|- align="center" bgcolor="ffbbbb"
| 159 || September 25 || Red Sox ||4–7 (14)||Morales (1–2)||Proctor (2–5)|| ||49,072||97–62
|- align="center" bgcolor="ffbbbb"
| 160 || September 26 || @ Rays ||2–5||Shields (16–12)||Noesí (2–2)|| Farnsworth (24)||18,772||97–63
|- align="center" bgcolor="ffbbbb"
| 161 || September 27 || @ Rays ||3–5|| McGee (4–2) || Soriano (2–3) || Farnsworth (25) || 22,820 ||97–64
|- align="center" bgcolor="ffbbbb"
| 162 || September 28 || @ Rays ||7–8 (12)||McGee (5–2)||Proctor (2–6)|| ||29,518||97–65
|-

Player stats

Batting
Note: G = Games played; AB = At bats; R = Runs; H = Hits; 2B = Doubles; 3B = Triples; HR = Home runs; RBI = Runs batted in; SB = Stolen bases; BB = Walks; AVG = Batting average; SLG = Slugging average

Source:

Pitching
Note: W = Wins; L = Losses; ERA = Earned run average; G = Games pitched; GS = Games started; SV = Saves; IP = Innings pitched; H = Hits allowed; R = Runs allowed; ER = Earned runs allowed; BB = Walks allowed; SO = Strikeouts

Source:

Postseason Game log

|- style="text-align:center; bgcolor="bbbbbb"
|- style="text-align:center;" bgcolor="bbffbb"
|1||October 1|| Tigers||9–3||Nova (1–0)||Fister (0–1)|| ||50,940||1–0
|- style="text-align:center;" bgcolor="ffbbbb"
|2||October 2|| Tigers||3–5||Scherzer (1–0)||García (0–1)|| ||50,596||1–1
|- style="text-align:center;" bgcolor="ffbbbb"
|3||October 3|| @ Tigers||4–5||Verlander (1–0)||Soriano (0–1)||Valverde (1)||43,581||1–2
|- style="text-align:center;" bgcolor="bbffbb"
|4||October 4|| @ Tigers||10–1||Burnett (1–0)||Porcello (0–1)|| ||43,527||2–2
|- style="text-align:center;" bgcolor="ffbbbb"
|5||October 6|| Tigers||2–3||Fister (1–1)||Nova (1–1)||Valverde (2)||50,960||2–3
|-

Notable Transactions

|- style=background:#fff;text-align:left;"
|
October 19, 2010: Signed free agent 3B Adam Silva.
October 25, 2010: Signed free agent OF Wilmer Romero.
November 1, 2010: RHP  Chad Gaudin elected free agency. Outrighted  Royce Ring to Scranton/Wilkes-Barre Yankees. Called up CF  Melky Mesa from Tampa Yankees.
November 7, 2010: 1B  Lance Berkman elected free agency. SS  Derek Jeter elected free agency. LF  Austin Kearns elected free agency. C  Chad Moeller elected free agency. LHP  Andy Pettitte elected free agency. RHP  Mariano Rivera elected free agency. LF  Marcus Thames elected free agency. RHP  Javier Vázquez elected free agency. RHP  Kerry Wood elected free agency. DH  Nick Johnson elected free agency.
November 19, 2010: Released RHP  Jonathan Albaladejo.
November 20, 2010: Signed free agent OF Breland Brown. Signed free agent 3B Jhoan Gomez. Signed free agent RHP Juan Matos. Signed free agent 1B Yheraldy Medo. Signed free agent SS Freddy Noguera. Signed free agent OF Jose Polanco.  Signed free agent RHP Leonel Vinas. Signed free agent RHP Eduardo Rivera. Signed free agent OF Miguel Mojica. Signed free agent C Julio Pina.
December 2, 2010: RHP  Alfredo Aceves elected free agency. RHP  Dustin Moseley elected free agency.
December 7, 2010: Signed free agent SS  Derek Jeter.
December 9, 2010: Claim LHP  Robert Fish off  waivers from  Arkansas Travelers. Claim RHP  Daniel Turpen off  waivers from  Portland Sea Dogs.
December 7, 2010: Signed free agent RHP  Mariano Rivera.
December 15, 2010: Signed free agent SS  Doug Bernier. Signed free agent RHP  Buddy Carlyle. Signed free agent C  Gustavo Molina. Signed free agent RHP  Mark Prior.
December 16, 2010: Signed free agent C  Russell Martin.
December 17, 2010: Claim  Jordan Parraz off waivers from Boston Red Sox.
January 3, 2011: Signed free agent LHP  Pedro Feliciano.
January 5, 2011: Claim Brian Schlitter off waivers from  Chicago Cubs.
January 18, 2011: Signed free agent RHP  Rafael Soriano.
January 6, 2011: Signed free agent OF José Figueroa. Signed free agent RHP Luis Niebla.
February 2, 2011: Designated  Jordan Parraz for assignment.
February 11, 2011: Signed free agent RHP  Luis Ayala.
February 14, 2011: Signed free agent RF  Andruw Jones. Designated RHP  Brian Schlitter for assignment.
February 15, 2011:  Philadelphia Phillies claim RHP  Brian Schlitter off  waivers from New York Yankees.
February 16, 2011: released LHP  Neal Cotts.
February 23, 2011: signed free agent 1B Nick Ebert.
February 3, 2011: signed free agent RHP Eliseo Batista.
March 13, 2011: Kansas City Royals claim Robert Fish off waivers.  Returned Rule 5 draft pick Daniel Turpen to the Pawtucket Red Sox
March 23, 2011: claimed LHP Jose Ortegano off waivers from Atlanta Braves
March 25, 2011: signed free agent RHP Kevin Millwood to minor league contract
March 27, 2011: Rule 5 draftee Lance Pendleton returned from Houston Astros
March 28, 2011: Eric Chavez added to roster from Scranton/Wilkes-Barre Yankees.  Released 2BRonnie Belliard.
March 30, 2011: Luis Ayala, Bartolo Colón, Freddy García, and Gustavo Molina added to roster from Scranton/Wilkes-Barre Yankees. Placed Francisco Cervelli and Pedro Feliciano on the 15-Day disabled list.  Placed Reegie Corona,  Colin Curtis, and Dámaso Marte on the 60-Day disabled list
March 31, 2011: Released RHP Rómulo Sánchez.
|-

|- style=background:#fff;text-align:left;"
|
April 9, 2011: signed free agent RHP Carlos Silva to a minor league contract
April 13, 2011: placed RHP Luis Ayala on the 15-Day disabled list
April 15, 2011: placed RHP Phil Hughes on the 15-Day disabled list.  Called up RHP Lance Pendletonfrom Scranton/Wilkes-Barre Yankees.
April 22, 2011: Called up RHP Buddy Carlyle from Scranton/Wilkes-Barre Yankees.  Released LHP Jose Ortegano.  Optioned Héctor Noesí to Scranton/Wilkes-Barre Yankees.
April 28, 2011:Signed free agent LHP Brad Halsey.
April 29, 2011: Activated C Francisco Cervelli from the 15-Day disabled list.  Optioned DH Gustavo Molina to Scranton/Wilkes-Barre Yankees.

Farm system

LEAGUE CHAMPIONS: Staten Island, GCL Yankees

References

External links

2011 New York Yankees schedule
2011 New York Yankees season at ESPN
2011 New York Yankees season at Baseball Reference

New York Yankees seasons
New York Yankees
New York Yankees
2010s in the Bronx
American League East champion seasons